Lee Yu-jun ( born 26 September 1989) is a South Korean-born Indonesian professional footballer who plays as a defensive midfielder for Liga 1 club Madura United.

Early life
He was also known as Lee Jong-in both in Brazil and South Korea, before he changed his name legally to Lee Yu-jun.

Club career
Born in South Korea, he lived in Brazil for 9 years since 2002 and played football there for 5 years. He started his professional career in 2007.
On 17 August 2016, he decided to sign a contract with Bhayangkara. On 9 May 2022, Lee was signed for Madura United to play in Liga 1 in the 2022–23 season.

Career statistics

Club

Honours

Club
Bhayangkara
 Liga 1: 2017

References

External links 
 
 

1989 births
Living people
Footballers from Seoul
South Korean footballers
Indonesian footballers
Indonesian people of Korean descent
Expatriate footballers in Brazil
Expatriate footballers in Indonesia
Campeonato Brasileiro Série D players
K3 League players
K League 1 players
K League 2 players
Liga 1 (Indonesia) players
South Korean expatriate footballers
South Korean expatriate sportspeople in Brazil
South Korean expatriate sportspeople in Indonesia
Association football midfielders
Madureira Esporte Clube players
Clube Atlético Sorocaba players
Americano Futebol Clube players
Esporte Clube Juventude players
Gangwon FC players
Chungju Hummel FC players
Bhayangkara F.C. players
Madura United F.C. players
Naturalised citizens of Indonesia